Manoora is a settlement in the Mid North region of South Australia on the Barrier Highway and upper reaches of the Gilbert River. It was also on the Peterborough railway line serving Burra until the line was closed. At the 2006 census, Manoora had a population of 277.

The first Europeans to settle at Manoora, in about 1841, were the sheep pastoralists Edward and William Peter, of Scottish origin. Having established their head station near present Manoora, for a few years the brothers (or cousins) held extensive occupation licences reaching toward the Kapunda and Burra districts.

Manoora is named for another early station in the district owned by A W J Grant. The name is believed to be derived from a native name for a spring or water.

References

Towns in South Australia
Mid North (South Australia)
1840s establishments in Australia